William H. Bell may refer to:

William Bell (photographer) (1830–1910), English-born American photographer
William H. Bell (Wisconsin politician) (1863–?), member of the Wisconsin State Assembly
William Henry Bell (1873–1946), English composer
William Henry Bell (businessman), businessman and politician in Hong Kong
William Henry Dillon Bell (1884–1917), New Zealand politician
William H. Bell (fl. 1860s), African-American servant of William Seward